Headed and Gutted is a live album by saxophonist Willis Jackson which was recorded in 1974 and first released on the Muse label.

Reception

In his review on Allmusic, Scott Yanow states that "Willis "Gator" Jackson's series of albums for Muse during the 1970s helped keep alive the soulful, tough tenor tradition of Illinois Jacquet, Gene Ammons, and (later on) Houston Person. For this particular set, the participation of guitarist Pat Martino made the date more notable than it might have been."

Track listing 
All compositions by Willis Jackson except as indicated
 "Headed and Gutted" - 5:19   
 "Blue Velvet" (Bernie Wayne, Lee Morris) - 8:18   
 "Miss Ann" - 6:27   
 "The Way We Were" (Alan Bergman, Marilyn Bergman, Marvin Hamlisch) - 6:51   
 "Gator Whale" - 6:06   
 "My One and Only Love" (Guy Wood, Robert Mellin) - 5:45

Personnel 
Willis Jackson - tenor saxophone
Pat Martino - guitar
Mickey Tucker - organ, electric piano
Bob Cranshaw - bass
Freddie Waits - drums
Richard Landrum – congas
Sonny Morgan - percussion

References 

Willis Jackson (saxophonist) live albums
1974 live albums
Muse Records live albums